Cruisin' for a Bruisin' may refer to:
 [[Cruisin' for a Bruisin' (Bruisers album)|Cruisin' for a Bruisin (Bruisers album)]] (1994)
 [[Cruisin' for a Bruisin' (Fate album)|Cruisin' for a Bruisin''' (Fate album)]] (1988)
 [[Cruisin' for a Bruisin' (Ol' 55 album)|Cruisin' for a Bruisin (Ol' 55 album)]] (1978)
 "Cruisin' for a Bruisin'", a song from Teen Beach Movie "Cruisin' for a Bruisin'", an episode of T.U.F.F. Puppy''